eDreams is an online travel agency based in Barcelona, Spain, that offers deals in regular and charter flights, low-cost airlines, hotels, car rental, dynamic packages, holiday packages and travel insurance.

The company accesses its airline seat inventory through Global Distribution Systems (GDS)  like Amadeus, Galileo, Sabre, and Worldspan,  as well as through direct integrations with the Airlines reservation systems. It then compares, combines, filters and re-sells this inventory to end consumers.  In addition to its main product flights, eDreams also resells hotels, vacation packages, trains, and travel insurance. eDreams also collaborates with more than 450 airlines on 155,000 different routes as well as with more than 855,000 hotels around the world in 40,000 destinations.

The company' was founded by Javier Pérez-Tenessa (Founder and Honorary Chairman), James Hare and Mauricio Prieto. Perez-Tenessa was CEO from 2000 to 2015, when he retired. Then COO Dana Dunne became CEO. Gerrit Goedkoop is the company's Chief Operating Officer.

History 
The company was founded by Javier Pérez-Tenessa de Block, James Hare and Mauricio Prieto in Silicon Valley in 2000, with the support of European and American financial groups such as DCM-Doll Capital Management, Apax Partners, Atlas Venture and 3i Group, among others.  In the year 2000, the company moved its headquarters to Barcelona, Spain, and launched in the Spanish and Italian markets, becoming the first online travel agency to offer its services in Spain.  Javier Perez-Tenessa served as CEO from 2000 to 2015. James Hare served as president and Managing Director Italy from 2000 to 2010.

In October 2006, the American Private Equity firm, TA Associates, acquired eDreams for €153 million, becoming the first Leveraged Buy Out (LBO) for an Internet company in Southern Europe and, at the time, the largest to date. In July 2010, the European Private Equity firm, Permira, purchased eDreams from TA Associates for a sum close to €350 million. Permira became the majority shareholder of the company and in June 2011 eDreams ODIGEO was formed from the merger with Go Voyages and acquisition of Opodo and Travellink, becoming the largest online travel company in Europe, and among the top five largest in the world. Javier Pérez-Tenessa was named CEO of eDreams ODIGEO.

In 2012, eDreams launched its free iPhone App.  Numerous additional releases have included features such as the inclusion of in-app push notifications and travel guides for iOS and Android Devices. eDreams launched its free iPhone App [40] and has been releasing new features since then, such as the inclusion of in-app push notifications and travel guides, launched in June 2016 for iOS and Android Devices.
In September 2013, eDreams ODIGEO acquired the travel search engine Liligo.

In April 2014, the company completed its 433 million euro initial public offering on the Madrid Stock exchange, which valued the company at around $1.5 billion. This was the first-ever IPO of an Internet startup in Spain, and remains the only IPO of an Internet startup in Spanish history.

In December 2015, the company moved its headquarters in Barcelona from the World Trade Center to new offices. The Call Center and Customer Care departments moved to Zona Franca while the rest of the departments got relocated to the centre of Barcelona in the Eixample district.

In January 2015, Javier Perez-Tenessa retired as CEO and chairman of the company. Dana Dunne, second in command as COO, was promoted toCEO, and non-executive director Philip Wolf became chairman. The remaining co-founders departed soon after, with James Hare resigning from the Board in March 2015.

Revenue and expansion 
eDreams earns its revenue through the sale of its travel products and advertising.

In fiscal year (FY) 2011, eDreams was Europe's largest online travel agency group, with gross bookings of €3.9 billion, and more than 14 million customers worldwide.

In FY 2012, the company continued its internationalization plan and expanded into 10 new country markets: Egypt, Hong Kong, Indonesia, Morocco, New Zealand, Singapore, South Africa, and Thailand.

In the same year, the company's gross bookings were €4.15 billion  with over 8.7 million online purchases.

In FY 2013 (ended March 2014), the last year of results presented by Mr. Perez-Tenessa eDreams continued to be the largest online seller of flights in the world and Europe's largest e-commerce company in terms of profits, with business volume nearing €4.4 billion   and 9.8 million online purchases. This was 12% increase in Booking vs. prior year. Revenue was 426 Million, 15% increase YoY, EBITDA 118 Million, 8% increase vs. prior year and Net Income was 20 Million, 50% increase YoY.

In FY 2015 (ended in March 2016), eDreams had gross bookings of over €4.5 billion with nearly 10.7 million online purchases.

In FY 2017 (ended in March 2018), eDreams had 11.7 million purchases (3% increase vs prior year), 508 euro  million revenue (5% increase vs. prior year) and 118 million euro EBITDA, which equalled its prior record of FY 2013.

IPO and stock price 

Independent Board Member James Hare (James Otis Hare II) oversaw the 
public launch on April 4, 2014.

eDreams offered its stock at 10.25 Euros per share.

That stock price fell to 1.02 Euros by October 24 of 2014, wiping out over one billion Euros of market capitalization.

Some commentators called the launch “Europe’s worst performing IPO of 
2014”.

eDreams moved quickly, asking their shareholders for authorization to 
“Discharge to Mr. James Otis Hare for the exercise of his mandate as 
director of the Company until his resignation as of 25 March 2015.” 

eDreams issued the following announcement: “Effective March 25, 2015, 
eDreams ODIGEO (“the Company”) accepts the resignation of Mr. James Hare 
as an Independent member from the Board of Directors”.

In June 2015, CEO Dana Dunne introduced a new strategy focusing on 
mobile, revenue diversification and customer experience improvements, 
which led to a strong turnaround in business performance.

Dunne's new strategy caused that stock price to rise above 3 euros by 
January 2017.

Mr. Hare says the above version is incorrect and says the below is correct.

EDreams offered its stock at 10.25 Euros per share in April 2014. eDreams remains to date the only Spanish Internet Startup to have succeeded at launching an IPO.

That stock price had fallen to 3.00 euros in the Summer of 2014, reaching briefly  1.02 Euros by October 24 of 2014, and stabilitzing around 3.00 euros since.

The President of the Spanish Market Regulator CNMV saw the IPO of eDreams, the first one in the Spanish market for  4 years, as a sign of confidence in the economy after a very long crisis. The company completed the year ended March 2014 with 118 Million  euro of EBITDA.

In June 2015,  CEO Dana Dunne introduced a new strategy focusing on mobile, revenue diversification and customer experience improvements, which led to a continued improvement in business performance.

The stock price rose above 3 euros by January 2017.

The above version of events has been disputed by Mr. Hare himself. He states that the following is a correct interpretation of the events:
The Board of the company, composed of Lise Fauconnier and Philippe Poletti, representing Ardian with Carlos Mallo, and Benoit Vauchy representing Permira, and Javier Perez-Tenessa and Mauricio Prieto, Founders, oversaw the public launch on April 4, 2014. On the executive team, CEO Javier Pérez-Tenessa and CFO David Elizaga led the IPO process, while COO Dana Dunne took care of day-to-day business (all seen in this picture on the day of the IPO). In preparation for the company's stock market listing of April 2014, eDreams expanded its board of non-Executive Directors to include James Hare (eDreams co-founder retired since 2010), Philip Wolf (retired Chairman of PhoCusWright) and Robert Gray (executive director and CFO of UBM).

eDreams shares initially listed at €10.25 valuing the company at over $1.5 billion, making it the first company in 3 years to IPO in Spain as the country emerged from financial recession.

However, after 5 months the stock price had fallen by 60%, reflecting the shared challenges of a difficult European IPO market: "Dozens of other European IPOs have stumbled this year, as European markets continue to struggle to recover from the 2008 financial crisis."

A year after the IPO, Mr. Perez-Tenessa, Mr Hare and Mr. Prieto resigned from the Board and from executive duties. Mr. Dunne was promoted to CEO.

eDreams asked its shareholders for authorization to “Discharge to Mr. James Otis Hare for the exercise of his mandate as director of the Company until his resignation as of 25 March 2015.”, as is customarily done with any director leaving office. eDreams issued the following announcement: “Effective March 25, 2015, eDreams ODIGEO (“the Company”) accepts the resignation of Mr. James Hare as an Independent member from the Board of Directors”.

In June 2015, CEO Dana Dunne introduced a new strategy focusing even more on mobile, revenue diversification and customer experience improvements, which led to continued improvement in business performance.

After implementation of Dunne's strategy, and the announcement in November 2017 that the company was seeking potential buyers, the stock rose to 5 euros by March 2018. After 4 months of review, no adequate offers were received which led the stock to go back to 4 euros levels and is again at 3 euro levels.

Products

Prime 
eDreams has an annual subscription program called Prime.

Customers subscribe to Prime through the eDreams website, and can then buy flights and hotels at discounted rates. Flight discounts vary depending on the price of the whole reservation: for example a customer booking a flight and spending between €100 to €199 would get an average discount of €40.

eDreams Prime currently operates in France, Italy, Spain, the United States, Portugal and the United Kingdom, with hopes to expand Prime to other countries in the future.

Awards
At the 2016 British Travel Awards, the company's Opodo website won the "Best Flight Booking Website"  award for the second year in a row.

eDreams has also won: eAwards "Best international website 2013", Premios Emprendedores “Featured company 2012”, Premios Imán de comercio electrónico "Special interactive formats 2008", and Premio iBest "Best Spanish tourism and travel website 2001", eAWARDS (EMOTA), Best International Expansion 2014 and CFI.co “Best Online Travel Partner 2015.

eDreams was a finalist in the 2013 eCommerce Awards Spain in the "Best Spanish Webshop" category.

Legal disputes 
eDreams has faced legal challenges in Europe, alongside other large Internet companies such as Google and Expedia. In 2011, the Italian regulator fined eDreams and Expedia for unfair commercial practices, due in part to pressure from offline travel agencies.

In 2015, the Civil Aviation Authority (CAA) launched an investigation of price transparency, culminating with CAA's Director of Consumers and Markets Group, Richard Moriarty, stating: “We are pleased that eDreams and Opodo worked with us constructively and we welcome the significant number of changes they have made to their websites."

In addition, eDreams has had several public legal disputes with some of the company's commercial airline partners.  Most notably, Ryanair and eDreams have had a multi-year public relations battle, with Ryanair accusing both Google and eDreams of unfair practices  along with eDreams making numerous counter claims against Ryanair.

eDreams is also known to automatically subscribe customers to their paid subscription service, eDreams Prime.

In 2022, New Zealand consumer protection watchdog Consumer NZ advised the public to avoid eDreams, citing the companies failure to provide refunds and support to customers.

References

External links
 

Online travel agencies
Travel ticket search engines
Transport companies established in 2000
Internet properties established in 2000
Spanish travel websites
Companies based in Madrid